Institute of Agriculture and Natural Resources is the name of multiple institutions including:

 Institute of Agriculture and Natural Resources, University of Nebraska–Lincoln
 Institute of Agriculture and Natural Resources, Yaroslav-the-Wise Novgorod State University
- see Yaroslav-the-Wise Novgorod State University § Institute of Agriculture and Natural Resources

Disambig-Class Agriculture articles
Disambig-Class organization articles